William A. Bottrell (born October 27, 1952) is an American record producer and songwriter.  He has collaborated with Michael Jackson, Madonna, Electric Light Orchestra and Sheryl Crow.

Biography 
Between 1967 and 1970, Bottrell attended Crescenta Valley Senior High in La Crescenta, California, he spent his junior year (1968–1969) at The Frankfurt International School in Oberursel, West Germany. He graduated in 1970 from Crescenta Valley Senior High. He attended the University of California, Santa Barbara between 1970 and 1972, studying for a bachelor's degree in Music.

In 1974, he married Elizabeth Jordan, whom he met in high school. That same year, Bottrell got his first job in music, as an engineer at California Recording Studio in Hollywood. In 1978, he moved over to Soundcastle Studios in Silverlake, where he met Jeff Lynne, who eventually hired him to engineer for ELO.  In 1979 his daughter Adrianne was born. The 1980s were spent freelance engineering between Europe and Los Angeles, with clients including: The Jacksons, ELO, Michael Jackson, Madonna, George Harrison, Starship and Tom Petty.  Daughter Laura was born in 1983.  He worked for Michael Jackson at his house in Encino between 1983 and 1986, recording tracks for Bad.  In 1988, Bottrell co-produced his first record, Aliens Ate My Buick by Thomas Dolby.  In 1989, Michael Jackson asked him to co-produce, engineer and write songs for his album Dangerous, co-writing and rapping on the album's biggest hit, "Black or White". The song spent 7 weeks at number one on the U.S. Billboard Hot 100 chart in the fall of 1991.

Bottrell's son William was born under difficult circumstances in 1990. That year, Bottrell built his own recording studio, Toad Hall Studio, next door to the Pasadena Playhouse in Pasadena, California and founded a weekly jam session called the "Tuesday Night Music Club". One of the resulting acts was Sheryl Crow, whose 1993 debut album (produced and co-written by Bottrell) was entitled Tuesday Night Music Club. Her single "All I Wanna Do" from that album won the Grammy Award for Record of the Year at the 37th Annual awards in 1994 for Bottrell and Crow. The album won two additional Grammys and sold 3.8 million in the US.

Bottrell was nominated for another Grammy for his work on Shelby Lynne's 1999 breakout album, I Am Shelby Lynne. During the making of that album, he closed his recording studio and moved his family of five to Northern California. His son William died after falling off a cliff in 1998.

He was separated from Elizabeth that year and divorced in 2000.

He has also worked with many other artists, including David Baerwald, Alisha's Attic, Five for Fighting, Rosanne Cash, Lisa Germano, Kevin Gilbert, Jasun Martz, Tom Petty, Rusted Root, Ben Jelen, Toy Matinee and Annie Stela.

In 1999, Bottrell formed a group called The Stokemen. This group has become known around northern California for their cabaret-style shows.

Discography 

1981: Hold On Tight – Electric Light Orchestra
1983: Northbound – Northbound
1983: Secret Messages – Electric Light Orchestra
1984: Victory – The Jacksons
1986: Balance of Power – Electric Light Orchestra
1987: Bad – Michael Jackson
1988: Aliens Ate My Buick – Thomas Dolby
1988: Traveling Wilburys Vol. 1 – Traveling Wilburys
1988: Streetwalker – Michael Jackson (released 2001)
1989: Like a Prayer – Madonna
1989: Full Moon Fever – Tom Petty
1989: Monkey Business – Michael Jackson (released 2004)
1990: I'm Breathless: Music from and Inspired by the Film Dick Tracy – Madonna
1990: Toy Matinee – Toy Matinee
1991: Truth or Dare – Madonna
1991: Dangerous – Michael Jackson
1991: Black Or White – Michael Jackson
1991: Give In To Me – Michael Jackson
1991: Who Is It – Michael Jackson
1991: No Soul No Strain – Wire Train
1992: Triage – David Baerwald
1993: Tuesday Night Music Club – Sheryl Crow
1994: When I Woke – Rusted Root
1995: Earth Song – Michael Jackson
1995: In Flight – Linda Perry
1997: Restless Heart – Tex Beaumont
1999: I Am Shelby Lynne – Shelby Lynne
2000: Surrender – Tom Petty and the Heartbreakers
2000: "For Real – Tom Petty & The Heartbreakers (Released in 2019)
2000: The House We Built – Alisha's Attic
2001: Songs from the West Coast – Elton John
2000: Welcome to my Party – Rusted Root
2002: Class of Dude – The Stokemen
2002: Rise – Kim Richey
2003: Free – Luan Parle
2004: Liam Titcomb – Liam Titcomb
2004: Benji Hughes – Benji Hughes (unreleased) 
2004: The Battle for Everything – Five for Fighting
2005: Annie Stela – Annie Stela
2005: Sierra Swan – Sierra Swan
2005: Black Cadillac – Rosanne Cash
2006: Save Me From Myself – Christina Aguilera
2006: Bird On A Wire – Toby Lightman
2006: On The Jungle Floor – Van Hunt
2007: Ex-Sensitive – Ben Jelen
2008: Detours'' – Sheryl Crow

References

External links 
 
 
 Bill Bottrell Music MySpace
 Bill Bottrell Unofficial Italian Website
 Tuesday Night Music Club – Unofficial Italian Website (new version)

1952 births
Living people
Songwriters from California
Record producers from California
Grammy Award winners
University of California, Santa Barbara alumni